Kfar Hoshen, also known as Safsufa (ספסופה), is a moshav in northern Israel. Located around four kilometres north of Meron, it falls under the jurisdiction of Merom HaGalil Regional Council.

History
The moshav was founded in 1949 by immigrants to Israel from Bulgaria and with the support of the Moshavim Movement. The land had previously belonged to the  Palestinian  village of Safsaf, whose residents fled to Lebanon after the Safsaf massacre in October 1948 during the 1948 Arab-Israeli war. The population was added in early years of the state by Jewish immigrants from Yemen and Aden, and starting in 1953 immigrants from Morocco and Tunisia also came.

The original name "Safsufa" is based on an identical name found in the Talmud, whose name is preserved in the village Safsaf; the Hebrew word "Safsaf" means an area where fruits ripen later than usual.

The residents work in agriculture and tourism.

Notable residents
Aryeh Deri

References

Moshavim
Populated places in Northern District (Israel)
Populated places established in 1949
1949 establishments in Israel
Bulgarian-Jewish culture in Israel
Moroccan-Jewish culture in Israel
Tunisian-Jewish culture in Israel
Yemeni-Jewish culture in Israel